This is a list of films which have placed number one at the weekend box office in Chile during 2007.

Films

See also
 List of Chilean films

External links
 Chilean Box Office Weekly

2007
Chile
2007 in Chile